Daria Leonidovna Virolaynen, née Reztsova, (born 24 January 1989) is a Russian biathlete.

Career
Virolaynen was born in Moscow. Her mother is biathlete and cross country skier Anfisa Reztsova. Virolaynen debuted at the World Cup on 6 March 2014, when she got second place in the sprint event in Pokljuka. Earlier in the year Virolaynen had finished third in the pursuit competition at the European Championships. The following season, Virolaynen got her second podium, a second place in the pursuit in Antholz-Anterselva.

References

External links

1989 births
Living people
Skiers from Moscow
Russian female biathletes
Universiade medalists in biathlon
Universiade gold medalists for Russia
Universiade silver medalists for Russia
Competitors at the 2011 Winter Universiade